Wauwatosa East High School is a comprehensive four-year public high school in the city of Wauwatosa, Wisconsin. It is part of the Wauwatosa School District. The school was originally known as Wauwatosa Senior High School until the opening of Wauwatosa West High School in September 1960. The first graduating class of Wauwatosa East High School was in June 1962. Today, the school is often colloquially referred to as Tosa East.

History 
The first high school in Wauwatosa opened at the site of the current Wauwatosa East in 1871.
Originally known as Wauwatosa High School, the school's name was changed to Wauwatosa East High School in September, 1961 after a rival high school was built on the west side of the city.

Much of the current structure was built in the second half of the 20th century. This resulted in substantial alterations to the original design of the building, including the removal of its tower and the closing of the school's third floor, which is now used by the district for storage. A restoration project in the early 2000s uncovered several Works Progress Administration murals on the walls of what was formerly the school's main entrance; the murals had been painted in the 1930s during the New Deal era and subsequently covered up.

The sports teams are named the Red Raiders. They were once represented by a logo of a cartoon Native American brave in warpaint and a mascot dressed as a Native American. In 2006 this came under protest, which led to the logo being changed to a shield with the letters 'TE' on the front and crossed spears behind and the mascot becoming changed to a pirate.

Athletics 
The school has varsity level sports teams for both men and women, including volleyball, basketball, softball, baseball, soccer, football, golf, wrestling, tennis, swimming and diving, cross country, track and field, and the Poms dance squad.

Intramural sports include Ultimate Frisbee, IBA (basketball), and skiing.

State championships 
1937: Boys' golf
1940: Boys' swimming and diving
1943: Boys' track and field
1944: Boys' swimming and diving
1945: Boys' swimming and diving
1946: Boys' golf, boys' swimming and diving, boys' cross country
1947: Boys' tennis, boys' swimming and diving
1948: Boys' basketball
1949: Boys' swimming and diving
1950: Boys' swimming and diving
1951: Boys' swimming and diving
1954: Boys' golf
1955: Boys' tennis
1956: Boys' tennis, boys' swimming and diving
1972: Boys' track and field, Class A
1974: Girls' volleyball, Class A
1975: Girls' volleyball, Class A
1980: Girls' volleyball, Class A
1981: Girls' basketball, Class A
1985: Girls' volleyball, Class A
1989: Boys' basketball, Class A; boys' volleyball, Class A
1990: Boys' soccer
1992: Girls' volleyball, Division 1
1993: Girls' soccer
1994: Girls' volleyball, Division 1
1996: Girls' soccer
1996: Boys' Volleyball
1997: Girls' soccer, Division 1
1997: Baseball
1998: Boys' soccer, Division 1
2006: Boys' volleyball
2008: Boys' basketball, Division 1
2016: Boys' table tennis, Division 1
2021: Boys' basketball, Division 1

Extracurricular activities 
The school's drama organization is the Wauwatosa East Players. The school stages two theatrical productions each year, one in fall and one in spring. All productions are staged in the Dale K. Hidde Theatre, named for the school's long-time theatrical director, which also serves as the school's auditorium and is home to the independently run Wauwatosa East Student Play Festival.

Wauwatosa East's clubs include The Cardinal Pennant Yearbook, The Cardinal News (student newspaper), National Honor Society, Spanish Honor Society, French Honor Society, German Club, German Honor Society, The Wauwatosa East chapter of the Junior Classical League, Linguistics Club, Philosophy Club, National Art Honor Society, Mu Alpha Theta, BattleBots, Chess Club, HOSA, SMART Team, Key Club, Amnesty International, AFS, Gay-Straight Alliance, STAND, International Thespian Society, Future Business Leaders of America, Forensics, Destination Imagination, We The People: The Citizen and the Constitution, CAFÉ, Key Club, Health Occupations Students of America, Latin Club, Art Club, Intramural Basketball Association (IBA), Science Club, Visual Arts Classic Team, Best Buddies,  and Student Council.

Awards 
In 2008, Wauwatosa East was recognized as a Blue Ribbon School.

Notable alumni 
Antler (born 1946), poet and educator; poet laureate of Milwaukee, 2002–03
Jovan Dewitt (born 1975), American football player and coach: NCAA Division 2 All-American player, NCAA Division 1 FBS Coach
Nancy Dickerson (1927–1997), pioneering radio and television journalist and reporter
Devin Harris (born 1983), professional basketball player (NBA)
Lucille Shapson Hurley (1922–1988), nutritionist
Tim Knoll, freestyle BMX rider
Mike Krol (born 1984), musician
John Morgridge (born 1933), businessman; CEO and chairman of Cisco Systems
Jeremy Scahill (born 1974), political writer and documentary filmmaker
Richard Schickel (1933–2017), film critic, author, and documentary filmmaker
Jerry Smith (born 1987), professional basketball player
Tony Smith (born 1968), professional basketball player (NBA)
Pete Stark (1931–2020), politician; member of the United States House of Representatives, 1973-2013, D-California
Thomas A. Steitz (1940–2018), biochemist; Nobel Prize in Chemistry laureate
Phillips Talbot (1915–2010), diplomat; United States Ambassador to Greece 1965-1969
Sugar Todd (born 1990), professional speed skater; member 2014 U.S. Olympic team
Michael Torke (born 1961), musician and composer
Ignatiy Vishnevetsky (born 1986), Russian-born film critic and essayist

References

External links
Wauwatosa School District
Wauwatosa East High School
Wauwatosa/Wauwatosa East High School Hall of Fame

Public high schools in Wisconsin
Educational institutions established in 1897
Schools in Milwaukee County, Wisconsin
Greater Metro Conference
Wauwatosa, Wisconsin
1897 establishments in Wisconsin